Family Matters is a 2022 Philippine drama film directed by Nuel Naval and produced under Cineko Productions and Top Story. It was released theatrically on December 25, 2022 as an entry to the 2022 Metro Manila Film Festival.

Premise
Family Matters revolves around the family of an elderly married couple consisting of Francisco (Noel Trinidad) and Eleanor (Liza Lorena), and their children: Kiko (Nonie Buencamino), Fortune (Mylene Dizon), Ellen (Nikki Valdez), and Enrico (JC Santos). Ellen flies for the United States in a bid to find a romantic partner, leaving the three other siblings to take care of their parents.

Cast
Noel Trinidad as Francisco
Ketchup Eusebio as young Francisco
Liza Lorena as Eleanor
Roxanne Guinoo-Yap as young Eleanor
Nonie Buencamino as Kiko – Francisco and Eleanor’s eldest child
Agot Isidro as Kiko's wife
Mylene Dizon as Fortune – the second of Francisco and Eleanor's children
Nikki Valdez as Ellen – the third of Francisco and Eleanor's children
James Blanco as Fortune's husband
JC Santos as Enrico – the youngest child of Francisco and Eleanor
Ian Pangilinan as Francis — eldest son of Kiko
Anna Luna
Ina Feleo
Allyson McBride

Boots Anson-Roa was offered to portray the role of Eleanor but had to decline due to recovering from an illness and conflict of interest reasons for being part of the Metro Manila Film Festival Screening Committee.

Production
Family Matters was produced under Cineko Productions and directed by Nuel Naval and written by Mel Mendoza-del Rosario. Prior to the COVID-19 pandemic, Cineko has expressed interest producing a film with Naval, who had not made a film with the studio outfit before. Naval had to deal with constraints caused by the pandemic for the film's production. He was given freedom to choose the members of the cast by the film's producer Enrico Roque. Naval has contrasted Tanging Yaman with Family Matters describing the former as tackling faith and family wealth while the latter just deals with contemporary everyday family affairs.

Reception

Box-office
Family Matters has reportedly earned  on its first day nationwide.

Release
Family Matters is premiered in cinemas in the Philippines on December 25, 2022 as one of the eight entries of the 2022 Metro Manila Film Festival. It was released in the United States on February 3, 2023.

References

External links
 

Philippine drama films
Films about families
Films about old age
Films about Filipino families
Films about siblings